The NWA Georgia Tag Team Championship was the top tag team championship in Georgia Championship Wrestling from 1968 to 1980, when it was replaced with the NWA National Tag Team Championship.

The title was revived in 1998 by Music City Wrestling as the MCW/NWA Georgia Tag Team Championship. In 1999, it became the top tag team title in NWA Georgia/Wildside as the NWA Wildside Tag Team Championship, until April 2005, when Wildside closed. After the close of NWA Wildside/Anarchy, the Georgia Tag Team Championships were revived by NWA Action. With the close of NWA Action in 2016, Georgia Championship Wrestling remerged in late 2020 and revived the titles in 2021.

Title history
 indicates that a title change happened no later than the date listed. Silver marks in the history indicate periods of unknown lineage.

See also
Georgia Championship Wrestling
National Wrestling Alliance
NWA National Tag Team Championship
NWA Wildside

References

Georgia Championship Wrestling championships
National Wrestling Alliance championships
Professional wrestling in Georgia (U.S. state)
Tag team wrestling championships
National Wrestling Alliance state wrestling championships